The AWA Midwest Tag Team Championship was a title in the American Wrestling Association from 1967 until 1971. It was for mid-level wrestlers and was mostly defended in the Omaha, Nebraska area.

Title history

See also
American Wrestling Association

Footnotes

References

American Wrestling Association championships
United States regional professional wrestling championships